Owen Walz (born February 27, 2004) is an American soccer player who plays as a defender for USL Championship club Loudoun United.

Club career
Walz began his career with the Arlington Soccer Association, a local youth soccer organization, before joining the youth setup at Major League Soccer club D.C. United. In February 2021, it was announced that Walz had committed to playing college soccer with the Virginia Cavaliers of the University of Virginia, joining as part of the incoming class of 2022. In March 2021, Walz was announced as part of the pre-season roster for D.C. United affiliate Loudoun United as an academy player.

On May 18, 2021, Walz made his senior debut for Loudoun United in the USL Championship against New York Red Bulls II, starting in the 2–1 defeat.

International career
In April 2021, Walz was called into the United States boy's youth identification camp as part of the 2004–2005 group.

Career statistics

References

External links
 Profile at U.S. Soccer Development Academy

2004 births
Living people
American soccer players
Association football defenders
Loudoun United FC players
USL Championship players
Soccer players from Virginia
People from Arlington County, Virginia